Didier Seguret (born 27 April 1956) is a French equestrian. He competed in two events at the 1992 Summer Olympics.

References

External links
 

1956 births
Living people
French male equestrians
Olympic equestrians of France
Equestrians at the 1992 Summer Olympics
Sportspeople from Toulouse